Augusto Antonio Barbera (born 25 June 1938) is an Italian judge and former constitutional law professor at the University of Bologna. In his political career he was member of the Chamber of Deputies between 1976 and 1994 for the Italian Communist Party and later the Democratic Party of the Left. In 1993 he served shortly as Minister without portfolio for relations with Parliament in the government of Prime Minister Carlo Azeglio Ciampi. Barbera has been Judge of the Constitutional Court of Italy since 21 December 2015.

Career
Barbera was born in Aidone on 25 June 1938. He obtained a degree in Jurisprudence with a specialization in constitutional law. Between 1967 and 1969 he worked abroad as a researcher at the universities of Karlsruhe and Heidelberg.

Barbera was a lecturer of constitutional law at the University of Catania from 1969 to 1970. He then took up similar position at the University of Ferrara, where he would remain until 1977. In that latter year he started working at the Institute of Public Law of the faculty of political science of the University of Bologna. He stopped working there in 1994. He was a professor of constitutional law at the University of Bologna. He took up emeritus status in 2014.

In 2013 Barbera was named as one of 35 academics in a commission on constitutional reform under Prime Minister Enrico Letta.

Barbera is a corresponding academic of the Academy of Sciences of the Institute of Bologna in the section of law, economics, and finance.

Political career
Barbera took up political office in 1976, when he was elected to the Chamber of Deputies for the Italian Communist Party. He would stay member of the Chamber until 1994. When the Communist Party dissolved in 1991, he stayed member of its successor party, the Democratic Party of the Left. From 1987 to 1992 Barbera served as president of the parliamentary committee on regional questions.

On 29 April 1993 Barbera was one of three former Communist Party politicians named in the new Ciampi Cabinet; the other two were Vincenzo Visco and Luigi Berlinguer. Barbera was made Minister without portfolio for relations with Parliament. It was the first time in 46 years that former Communist Party politicians were made part of the cabinet. Several hours after being officially named in the government, a rupture broke in the coalition over the handling of charges in Parliament against former Prime Minister Bettino Craxi. The Ministers of the Democratic Party of the Left, to which Barbera belonged, resigned. His replacement, Paolo Barile, took office on 4 May.

On 16 December 2015, the Italian Parliament elected three candidates to the Constitutional Court of Italy: Franco Modugno, Giulio Prosperetti and Barbera. The election was realized after 31 previous failed attempts. Barbera was the candidate of the Democratic Party, he obtained 581 votes in favor. He was sworn in five days after his election.

Honour 
 : Knight Grand Cross of the Order of Merit of the Italian Republic (31 may 2017)

References

|-

1938 births
Living people
People from Aidone
Italian Communist Party politicians
Democratic Party of the Left politicians
Democrats of the Left politicians
Democratic Party (Italy) politicians
Government ministers of Italy
Deputies of Legislature VII of Italy
Deputies of Legislature VIII of Italy
Deputies of Legislature IX of Italy
Deputies of Legislature X of Italy
Deputies of Legislature XI of Italy
Judges of the Constitutional Court of Italy
Scholars of constitutional law
Academic staff of the University of Bologna
Academic staff of the University of Catania
Academic staff of the University of Ferrara
Jurists from Sicily
Knights Grand Cross of the Order of Merit of the Italian Republic